List of Guggenheim Fellowships awarded in 1960.

1960 U.S. and Canadian Fellows

 Ursula Helen Knight Abbott, professor of avian sciences, University of California, Davis: 1960
 Henry David Aiken, deceased, philosophy: 1960
 Robert Day Allen, deceased, biology: 1960, 1965
 Harold Altman, artist, Lamont, Pennsylvania: 1960, 1961
 James LeRoy Anderson, professor of physics, Stevens Institute of Technology: 1960
 David Aronson, painter; emeritus professor of art, Boston University: 1960
 John W. Atkinson, professor emeritus of psychology, University of Michigan: 1960
 Peter L. Auer, professor of mechanical and aerospace engineering and director, Laboratory of Plasma Studies, Cornell University: 1960
 Juan Bautista Avalle-Arce, Jose Miguel Barandiaran Professor of Basque Studies, University of California, Santa Barbara: 1960
 Milton Babbitt, composer; Henry Shubael Conant Professor Emeritus of Music, Princeton University, member of the faculty, The Juilliard School: 1960
 Richard McLean Badger, deceased, chemistry: 1960
 Louis Coombs Weller Baker, professor emeritus of chemistry, Georgetown University: 1960
 John W. Baldwin, Charles Homer Haskins Professor of History, The Johns Hopkins University: 1960, 1983
 Ernest Aubrey Ball, deceased, biology-plant science: 1960
 Paul Walden Bamford, emeritus professor of history, University of Minnesota: 1960
 William Alvin Baum, research professor emeritus of astronomy, University of Washington, Seattle: 1960
 George Bernard Benedek, Alfred H. Caspary Professor of Physics and Biological Physics, Massachusetts Institute of Technology: 1960
 John Berry, writer, Los Angeles: 1960
 George Athan Billias, professor of American history, Clark University: 1960
 James H. Billington, The Librarian of Congress, Washington, D. C.: 1960
 Robert W. Birge, associate director emeritus, Physics Division, Lawrence Berkeley Laboratory, University of California, Berkeley: 1960
 Z. William Birnbaum, professor emeritus of mathematics, University of Washington: 1960
 Harold H. Biswell, deceased, biology-plant science: 1960
 Donald S. Bloom, painter; retired art educator, Piscataway Schools, New Jersey: 1960
 Richard Mitchell Bohart, professor emeritus of entomology, University of California, Davis: 1960
 Bradford Allen Booth, deceased, 19th-century English literature: 1960
 William Francis Brace, professor of geology, Massachusetts Institute of Technology: 1960
 Howard Bradford, graphic artist and painter, Monterey, California: 1960
 Theodore W. Bretz, deceased, biology-plant science: 1960
 Barry Shelley Brook, deceased, music research: 1960, 1966
 Franz R. Brotzen, Stanley C. Moore Professor Emeritus, Rice University: 1960
 Frank Edward Brown, deceased, classics: 1960
 Gene Adam Brucker, Shepard Professor Emeritus of History, University of California, Berkeley: 1960
 Zbigniew Brzezinski, counselor, Center for Strategic & International Studies (CSIS): 1960
 Byron Burford, painter; professor of art, University of Iowa: 1960
 John W. Cahn, senior NIST fellow, National Institute of Standards & Technology; adjunct professor of materials science, Massachusetts Institute of Technology: 1960
 James E. Canright, professor emeritus of botany, Arizona State University: 1960
 Hollis B. Chenery, deceased, economics: 1960
 David Keun Cheng, Centennial Professor Emeritus of Electrical Engineering, Syracuse University: 1960
 Paul A. Clement, deceased, classics: 1960
 Hennig Cohen, deceased, American literature: 1960
 Marshall H. Cohen, professor emeritus, Law Center, University of Southern California: 1960, 1980
 Germaine Cohen-Bazire, retired director of research, Pasteur Institute, Paris: 1960. aka Stanier, Germaine
 Henry Steele Commager, deceased, U. S. History: 1960
 Jane Marvel Cooper, poet, New York City; professor emeritus, Sarah Lawrence College: 1960
 William David Davies, George Washington Ivey Professor Emeritus of Advanced Studies and Research in Christian Origins, Duke University; Visiting Distinguished University Professor and Holder of the Bradford Chair in Religion-Studies, Texas Christian University: 1960, 1966
 Herbert Andrew Deane, deceased, political science: 1960
 Andre Jacques de Bethune, professor emeritus of chemistry, Boston College: 1960
 Phillip Howard De Lacy, professor emeritus of classical studies, University of Pennsylvania: 1960
 Raúl Alfredo Del Piero, deceased, Spanish: 1960
 Vincent P. De Santis, professor emeritus of history, University of Notre Dame: 1960
 Albert Henry Detweiler, deceased, architecture: 1960
 Ernest Stanley Dodge, deceased, anthropology: 1960
 Leonard W. Doob, deceased, psychology: 1960
 Daniel Charles Drucker, graduate research professor emeritus of engineering sciences, University of Florida: 1960
 Philip Calvin Durham, deceased, American literature. 1960
 Leonard Edmondson, printmaker; professor of printmaking, Otis Art Institute of Los Angeles County: 1960
 Robert Martin Eisberg, professor of physics, University of California, Santa Barbara: 1960
 Alexander Eliot, writer, Venice, California: 1960
 Howard Tasker Evans, Jr., scientist emeritus, U.S. Geological Survey, Reston, Virginia: 1960
 Paul P. Ewald, deceased, physics: 1960
 Charles Fairman, deceased, law: 1960
 Samson Lane Faison, Jr., Amos Lawrence Professor Emeritus of Art, Williams College: 1960
 Alan Judson Faller, research professor, Institute of Fluid Dynamics and Applied Mathematics, University of Maryland, College Park: 1960
 Eldon Earl Ferguson, retired director, Climate Monitoring and Diagnostics Laboratory, Boulder, Colorado: 1960
 George Brooks Field, Robert Wheeler Willson Professor of Applied Astronomy, Harvard University: 1960
 Wesley Robert Fishel, deceased, political science: 1960
 Walter D. Fisher, deceased, economics: 1960
 William Bache Fretter, deceased, physics: 1960
 Morton Fried, deceased, anthropology: 1960
 Elias Friedensohn, deceased, fine arts: 1960
 Lee Friedlander, photographer, New City, New York: 1960, 1962, 1977
 Jean Garrigue, deceased, poetry: 1960
 Ignace Gelb, deceased, Near Eastern studies: 1960
 Kahlil Gibran, deceased, sculptor, Boston, Massachusetts: 1959,1960
 Langdon Brown Gilkey, professor of theology, University of Chicago Divinity School: 1960, 1965
 James Gilluly, deceased, geology: 1960
 William Henry Gilman, deceased, American literature: 1960, 1964
 David Ginsburg, deceased, chemistry: 1960
 Frank Hindman Golay, deceased, economics: 1960
 Edward David Goldberg, emeritus professor of chemistry, Scripps Institution of Oeanography, University of California, San Diego: 1960
 Frank Gonzalez, artist, Ross California: 1960
 Leonard Seymour Goodman, deceased, physics: 1960
 John Edward Grafius, deceased, plant science: 1960
 Charles Richard Grau, emeritus professor of avian sciences, University of California, Davis: 1960
 Moshe Greenberg, emeritus professor of the Bible, Hebrew University of Jerusalem: 1960
 Joshua Greenfeld, writer, Pacific Palisades, California: 1960
 Donald Redfield Griffin, associate of zoology in the Museum of Comparative Zoology, Harvard University: 1960
 Dwain Douglas Hagerman, deceased, biochemistry: 1960
 Robert Louis Haig, Jr., deceased, 18th-century English literature: 1960
 Morris Halle, institute professor emeritus, Massachusetts Institute of Technology: 1960
 Paul Handler, deceased, physics: 1960
 Earl D. Hanson, deceased, medicine: 1960
 Morgan Harris, professor emeritus of molecular and cellular biology, University of California, Berkeley: 1960
 James P. Hartnett, professor of energy engineering, University of Illinois at Chicago Circle: 1960
 Vernon Judson Harward, Jr, deceased, medieval literature: 1960
 J. Christopher Herold, deceased, French: 1960
 Israel Nathan Herstein, deceased, mathematics: 1960, 1968
 Robert Dickson Hill, research physicist, University of California, Santa Barbara: 1960
 Elisabeth F. Hirsch, deceased, professor emeritus of philosophy, Trenton State College: 1960
 Hans Albert Hochbaum, deceased, writer-in-residence, Delta Waterfowl Research Station, Manitoba: 1960
 Ann Hitchcock Holmes, critic at large, Houston Chronicle: 1960
 Judd D. Hubert, professor emeritus of French, University of California, Irvine: 1960
 Ralph P. Hudson, physicist, Chevy Chase, Maryland: 1960
 J.R.T. Hughes, deceased, economics: 1960
 William R. Hutchison, Charles Warren Professor of the History of Religion in America, Harvard University: 1960
 Georg Gerson Iggers, distinguished professor of history, State University of New York at Buffalo: 1960
 Leon Jacobs, chairman of the board, and president, Gorgas Memorial Institute, Bethesda, Maryland: 1960
 Hans Jaeger, deceased, German: 1960
 Terry Walter Johnson, Jr., Retical Professor Emeritus of Botany, Duke University: 1960
 Harold Sledge Johnston, professor emeritus of chemistry, University of California, Berkeley: 1960
 George Hilton Jones, III, professor emeritus of history, Eastern Illinois University: 1960
 John Paul Jones, deceased, fine art: 1960
 Richard Victor Jones, Robert L. Wallace Professor of Applied Physics, Harvard University: 1960
 Jay R. Judson, William R. Kenan, Jr., professor emeritus of the history of art, University of North Carolina at Chapel Hill: 1960
 Robert Karplus, deceased, physics: 1960, 1973
 Pieter Hendrik Keesom, deceased, physics: 1960
 György Kepes, institute professor emeritus and professor emeritus of visual design, Massachusetts Institute of Technology: 1960
 Philip Keppler, Jr, deceased, music research: 1960
 Joseph C. Kiger, professor of history, University of Mississippi: 1960
 Albert D. Kirwan, deceased, U.S. History: 1960
 Walter David Knight, professor emeritus of physics, University of California, Berkeley: 1960
 Enno Edward Kraehe, William W. Corcoran Professor Emeritus of History, University of Virginia: 1960
 Alexander Jerry Kresge, professor of chemistry, University of Toronto: 1960
 Henry Kučera, deceased, Fred M. Seed Professor Emeritus of Cognitive and Linguistic Sciences, Brown University: 1960
 Paco Lagerstrom, deceased, professor of applied mathematics, California Institute of Technology: 1960
 Willis Eugene Lamb, Jr., Regents' Professor of Physics and Optical Science, University of Arizona: 1960
 Pearl Lang, choreographer, New York City: 1960, 1969
 John Raphael Laughnan, deceased, biochemistry-molecular biology: 1960
 Dan H. Laurence, scholar, San Antonio, Texas: 1960, 1961, 1972
 Antje Bultmann Lemke, professor emerita of library science, School of Information Studies, Syracuse University: 1960
 Marvin David Levy, composer, New York City: 1960, 1964
 Robert Murdoch Lewert, professor emeritus of microbiology, University of Chicago: 1960
 Arthur Lindenbaum, retired biochemist, New Braunfels, Texas: 1960
 Seymour Lipton, deceased, fine arts-sculpture: 1960
 Ralph Livingston, deceased, chemistry: 1960
 Daniel Archibald Livingstone, deceased, James B. Duke Professor of Zoology and Geology, Duke University: 1960
 Horace Gray Lunt, Samuel Hazzard Cross Professor Emeritus of Slavic Languages and Literature, Harvard University: 1960
 Clyde L. Manschreck, deceased. Harry and Hazel Chavanne Professor Emeritus of Religious Studies, Rice University: 1960
 Dillon Edward Mapother, associate vice chancellor for research and associate dean of the Graduate College, University of Illinois-Champaign: 1960
 Henry Margenau, deceased, physics: 1960
 John L. Margrave, E. D. Butcher Professor of Chemistry and vice president for advanced studies and research, Rice University: 1960
 Lester C. Mark, professor emeritus of anesthesiology, College of Physicians and Surgeons, Columbia University: 1960
 Julian B. Marsh, visiting scientist, USDA-Human Nutrition Center, Tufts University; professor emeritus of biochemistry, Medical College of Pennsylvania: 1960
 Salvatore John Martirano, deceased, music composition: 1960
 Max Smith Matheson, retired chemist, consultant, Downers Grove, Illinois: 1960
 Thane H. McCulloh, consultant, Petroleum Geoscience Consulting, Dallas: 1960
 William Gerald McLoughlin, deceased, U.S. History: 1960
 Jerrold Meinwald, Goldwin Smith Professor of Chemistry, Cornell University: 1960, 1976
 Hsien Chang Meng, professor emeritus of physiology, Vanderbilt University: 1960
 Henry Cord Meyer, professor emeritus of history, University of California, Irvine: 1960
 Ernest A. Michael, professor of mathematics, University of Washington: 1960
 Agnes K. L. Michels, deceased, classics: 1960
 George C. Miles, deceased, Near Eastern studies: 1960
 John Preston Moore, deceased, Latin American literature: 1960
 Charles Wickliffe Moorman, distinguished university professor emeritus and vice president emeritus of academic affairs, University of Southern Mississippi: 1960
 Lincoln E. Moses, emeritus professor of statistics, Stanford University: 1960
 James Malcolm Moulton, deceased, biology: 1960
 Milton K. Munitz, deceased, philosophy: 1960
 John Charles Nelson, professor emeritus of Italian, Columbia University: 1960
 William Stein Newman, deceased, music research: 1960
 Theodore Burton Novey, transactional analyst instructor, Glenview, Illinois: 1960
 Margaret Sinclair Ogden, deceased, medieval studies: 1960
 Donald E. Osterbrock, emeritus professor of astronomy and astrophysics, University of California, Santa Cruz: 1960, 1982
 William Pachner, painter, Woodstock, New York: 1960
 Abraham Pais, deceased, physics: 1960
 Hans Panofsky, deceased, astronomy-astrophysics: 1960
 Vernon J. Parenton, deceased, sociology: 1960
 Earl Randall Parker, deceased, engineering: 1960
 Constantinos A. Patrides, deceased, 16th- & 17th-century English literature: 1960, 1963
 Reinhard G. Pauly, professor emeritus of music, Lewis and Clark College: 1960
 Wilder Penfield, deceased, medicine: 1960
 Willis Bagley Person, emeritus professor of chemistry, University of Florida: 1960
 Carl Pfaffmann, deceased, psychology: 1960
 John Leddy Phelan, deceased, Spanish & Latin American History: 1960
 Allen W. Phillips, professor emeritus of Spanish and Portuguese, University of California, Santa Barbara: 1960, 1973
 John Grissim Pierce, professor emeritus of biological chemistry, University of California, Los Angeles: 1960, 1975
 David H. Pinkney, deceased, French history: 1960
 James N. Pitts, Jr., deceased, research chemist, University of California, Irvine: 1960
 Ronald F. Probstein, Ford Professor of Mechanical Engineering, Massachusetts Institute of Technology: 1960
 John Robert Raper, deceased, biology: 1960
 Henry H. Reed, Jr, writer; curator of Central Park, New York City: 1960
 Warren S. Rehm, deceased, biochemistry-molecular biology: 1960
 Edgar Reich, deceased, professor of mathematics, University of Minnesota: 1960
 Stanley Reiter, Morrison Professor of Economics, Mathematics, and Management, Northwestern University: 1960
 Millicent Barton Rex, deceased, British history: 1960
 Laurens H. Rhinelander, deceased . Law: 1960
 George Warren Rickey, deceased sculptor, East Chatham, New York: 1960, 1961
 Robert Edgar Riegel, deceased, U.S. History: 1960
 David Mark Ritson, professor of physics, Stanford University: 1960
 Allan L. Rodgers, professor of geography, Pennsylvania State University: 1960
 Hartley Rogers, Jr., professor of mathematics, Massachusetts Institute of Technology: 1960
 Harold Emil Rorschach, Jr., deceased, physics: 1960
 Reinhardt Mathias Rosenberg, deceased, engineering: 1960
 M. L. Rosenthal, deceased, literary criticism: 1960, 1964
 Archibald Frank Ross, deceased, professor emeritus of plant pathology, Cornell University: 1960
 Arthur M. Ross, deceased, economics: 1960
 Jacques Rousseau, deceased, biology-plant science: 1960
 Inez Scott Ryberg, deceased, classics: 1960
 Charles Richard Sanders, professor emeritus of English, Duke University: 1960, 1972
 William H. Saunders, Jr., emeritus professor of chemistry, University of Rochester: 1960
 Wolfgang Manfred Schubert, professor emeritus of chemistry, University of Washington: 1960
 Franz Schurmann, professor of history and of sociology, University of California, Berkeley: 1960
 Albert Seay, deceased, music research: 1960
 Joachim Hans Seyppel, writer, Berlin: 1960
 George Gaylord Simpson, deceased, earth science: 1960
 James Morton Smith, director, Henry Francis du Pont Winterthur Museum, Winterthur, Delaware: 1960
 William Overton Smith, composer; professor emeritus of music, University of Washington: 1960, 1961
 Rolf Hans Soellner, deceased, 16th- & 17th-century English literature: 1960
 Waclaw J. Solski, deceased, Russian history: 1960
 Leo Harry Sommer, deceased, chemistry: 1960
 Henry S. Sommers, Jr., retired research physicist, Newton, Pennsylvania: 1960
 David Derek Stacton, deceased, fiction: 1960, 1966
 Wendell Meredith Stanley, deceased, biochemistry: 1960
 Lloyd William Staples, professor emeritus of geology, University of Oregon: 1960
 Herbert Max Steiner, professor of physics, University of California, Berkeley: 1960
 Peter O. Steiner, emeritus professor of economics and law and emeritus dean, College of Literature, Science and the Arts, University of Michigan: 1960
 Edward Arthur Steinhaus, deceased, biochemistry: 1960
 Lionel Stevenson, deceased, 19th-century English literature: 1960
 Francis Gordon Albert Stone, Robert A. Welch Distinguished Professor of Chemistry, Baylor University, Waco, Texas: 1960
 Howard Coombs Stutz, deceased, professor of botany, Brigham Young University: 1960
 Harvey Swados, deceased, fiction: 1960
 William A. Swanberg, deceased, biography: 1960
 Knud George Swenson, deceased, biochemistry: 1960
 William Harrison Telfer, professor of zoology, University of Pennsylvania: 1960
 Mark J. Temmer, professor of French, University of California, Santa Barbara: 1960
 P. Emery Thomas, professor of mathematics, University of California, Berkeley: 1960
 Virgil Thomson, deceased, music composition: 1960
 Marion R. Tinling, historian, Sacramento, California: 1960
 Frank Sargent Tomkins, deceased. Consultant, Argonne National Laboratory, University of Chicago: 1960
 Philip Troen, physician-in-chief emeritus, Montefiore Hospital; professor of medicine, University of Pittsburgh School of Medicine: 1960
 Herbert Henry Uhlig, deceased, chemistry: 1960
 Maurice Valency, deceased, literary criticism: 1960, 1964
 Robert Lawrence Vernier, professor emeritus of pediatrics and pathology, University of Minnesota Medical School: 1960
 William Edgar Vinacke, professor emeritus of psychology, State University of New York at Buffalo: 1960
 Richard Wagner, deceased, medicine: 1960
 Franklin Dickerson Walker, deceased, American literature: 1960
 Hsien Chung Wang, deceased, mathematics: 1960
 Jui Hsin Wang, Einstein Professor of Science, State University of New York at Buffalo: 1960, 1972
 Joseph Anthony Ward, Jr, professor of English, Rice University: 1960
 Kurt Weinberg, professor emeritus of French, German, and comparative literature, University of Rochester: 1960
 Stanley Newman Werbow, emeritus professor of Germanic languages, University of Texas at Austin: 1960
 Bartlett Jere Whiting, deceased, medieval literature: 1960
 William Cooper Wildman, deceased, chemistry: 1960
 Thurman Wilkins, retired professor of English, Queens College, City University of New York, Bandon, Oregon: 1960
 Richard Wilson, Mallinckrodt Research Professor of Physics, Harvard University: 1960, 1968
 Donald Windham, writer, New York City: 1960
 Finn Wold, deceased, biochemistry: 1960
 Ralph Stoner Wolfe, professor emeritus of microbiology, University of Illinois at Urbana-Champaign: 1960, 1975
 Elizabeth Wood, deceased, architecture: 1960
 Frank Nelson Young, Jr., professor emeritus of zoology, Indiana University: 1960
 Harold Zirin, emeritus professor of astrophysics, California Institute of Technology: 1960

1960 Latin American and Caribbean Fellows

 Tomás Batista Encarnación, artist, San Juan, Puerto Rico: 1960
 Mario Davidovsky, composer, Boston, Massachusetts; MacDowell Professor Emeritus of Music and director, Electronic Music Center, Columbia University: 1960, 1961
 Raúl Narciso Dessanti, professor of geology, National University of the South, Bahía Blanca: 1960
 Oscar Luis Galmarini, head, honorary professor emeritus of chemistry, University of Buenos Aires: 1960
 Alercio Moreira Gomes, professor of applied mathematics, Fluminense Federal University, Brazil: 1960
 Armando T. Hunziker, director, IMBIV, COINCET-Univ. Nac. Córdoba; director, Botanical Museum, National University of Córdoba: 1960, 1978
 Delfina E. López Sarrelangue, research historian, Institute of Historical Research, National Autonomous University of Mexico: 1960
 Sergio Mascarenhas Oliveira, professor of physics and director of the Instituto de Estudos Avancados, Universidade de São Paulo at Sao Carlos:1960
 Eustorgio Méndez, head, Dept of Zoology, Gorgas Memorial Laboratory, Panama: 1960
 Juan Robe Munizaga Villavicencio, rto. professor of physical anthropology, University of Chile: 1960
 Guillermo R. J. Pilar, professor of biology, University of Connecticut: 1960, 1962
 Teresa Pinto-Hamuy, professor of physiology, University of Chile: 1960
 Genaro O. Ranit, retired assistant professor of animal husbandry, University of the Philippines at Los Baños, Laguna; International Poultry Expert, Poultry Research Institute, Food and Agriculture Organization of the United Nations, Karachi: 1960, 1961
 Alexandre Augusto Martins Rodrigues, professor of mathematics, University of São Paulo: 1960
 Andrew Salkey, deceased, folklore and popular culture: 1960
 Bienvenido Santos, deceased, fiction: 1960
 Hugh Worrell Springer, deceased, political science: 1960
 Gonzalo Zubieta Russi, mathematician, Mexico, D.F.: 1960

External links
Guggenheim Fellows for 1960

See also
Guggenheim Fellowship

1960
1960 awards